Burns Park Sculpture Garden is in Denver, Colorado, U.S.

References

Gardens in Colorado
Parks in Denver
Sculpture gardens, trails and parks in the United States